Balloon Brothers is a two-player Tetris-type arcade game released by East Technology in 1992. Different colored balloons in different shapes float to the top (instead of falling). Completing a full row across makes that row disappear.

References

External links
 

1992 video games
Arcade video games
Arcade-only video games
Falling block puzzle games
Video games developed in Japan